Landscapes of England: An Exploration with W.G. Hoskins is a BBC television documentary series broadcast on BBC Two in 1976 and 1978. Written and presented by Professor W.G. Hoskins, the series was a televisual accompaniment to his seminal text The Making of the English Landscape (1955), examining how human influence has greatly shaped the landscape of distinct regions in England.

Hoskins's book The Making of the English Landscape had formed the basis of a 50-minute Horizon episode broadcast in 1972 presented by Hoskins and produced by Peter Jones. Many of the same crew returned for Landscapes of England, which focussed on individual landscapes within England.

Two series of six episodes were produced. Joan Thirsk characterises his presentation of the series as "standing out in all weathers, rubicund, benign, usually smiling, though he was once ankle deep in river water." Professor Hoskins also wrote two accompanying books; English Landscapes and a series of essays One Man's England derived from the twelve programmes. Both series were released on DVD by Simply Media in 2019.

Episode list

Series 1

Series 2

References

External links 

1976 British television series debuts
BBC television documentaries